In European tradition, a zephyr is a light wind or a west wind, named after Zephyrus, the Greek god or personification of the west wind.

Zephyr may also refer to:

Arts and media

Fiction

Fiction media 

 Zephyr (film), a 2010 Turkish feature film
 Zephyr (video game), a 1994 PC game

Fictional characters 
 Zephyr (comics), a character in the Marvel Comics universe
 Zephyr (Queer as Folk), a fictional comic book character created by characters in Queer as Folk
 Zephyr, a playable character from Warframe
 Characters named Zephyr also appear in:
 City of Heroes, a video game
 Heroes of Newerth, a video game
 The Hunchback of Notre Dame II, a film (voiced by Haley Joel Osment)
 Killjoys (TV series), a TV series
 My Little Pony: Friendship is Magic, a TV series
 Need for Speed Rivals, a video game
 One Piece, a manga series
 Ratchet & Clank, a video game series
 Resonance of Fate, a video game
 Tornado Outbreak, a video game
 XCOM: Chimera Squad, a video game
 How to Train Your Dragon: Homecoming, a short animated film

Fictional concepts and objects 

 In the TV series Agents of S.H.I.E.L.D., Zephyr One, a transport and mobile headquarters
 In the novel  Boy's Life, an Alabama town and setting of the novel
 In the 2010 film Knight and Day, a prototype battery
 In The Twilight Zone episode "The Mighty Casey", The Hoboken Zephyrs, a baseball team
 In the children's book The Wreck of the Zephyr, a sailboat
 In the video game The Elder Scrolls V: Skyrim, an obtainable bow
In the video game Spyro 2: Ripto's Rage!, a realm home to bug-like inhabitants

Music

Albums 

 Zephyr (Zephyr album)
 Zephyr (Basement Jaxx album), a 2009 EP by Basement Jaxx

Performers 

 Zephyr (band), a blues-based hard rock band formed in 1968 in Boulder, Colorado
 The Zephyrs, an Edinburgh, Scotland-based indie band
 Zephyr Quartet, a string quartet based in Adelaide, South Australia

Songs 

 "Zephyr" (Madeon song), written and produced by Madeon, from the album Adventure
 "Zephyr", a song from the Mary Chapin Carpenter album The Age of Miracles
 "Zephyr", a song by one man project Conjure One (Rhys Fulber) from the album Exilarch
 "The Zephyr Song", from the Red Hot Chili Peppers' album By the Way
 "Zephyrus" (Bloc Party song), by the band Bloc Party, on their album Intimacy
 "Andvari" (translates to zephyr from Icelandic), a song on the Sigur Rós album Takk...

Radio stations 

 WRKN (FM), an alternative rock station (formerly known as 106.1 the Zephyr) in New Orleans, Louisiana
 KZFR, a community radio station in Chico, California
 WZPH-LP, 96.7 FM The Zephyr, a Classic Oldies station located in Zephyrhills, Florida

Other media 

 Zephyr (sculpture), a 1998 stainless steel sculpture by Steve Wooldridge
 Zephyr Books, a publishing imprint of the Continental Book Company in the 1940s

Businesses
 Zephyr Books, a publishing imprint of the Continental Book Company in the 1940s
 Zephyr Headwear, a headwear company
 Zephyr Technology, a medical technology company
 Jeff Ho Surfboards and Zephyr Productions, a surfboard manufacturing facility and surf shop

People
 Zephyr (artist), graffiti artist from New York City
 Mikhail Mukasei (code name: Zephyr), Soviet spy active from the 1940s through the 1970s
 Zephyr Moore Ramsey, African American lawyer based in Southern California
 Zephyr Teachout, professor at Fordham University and former candidate for governor of New York
 Zephyr Wright, African American civil rights activist and chef for President Lyndon Johnson

Places
 Zephyr, Ontario, Canada
 Zephyr, North Carolina, US
 Zephyr, Texas, US
 Zephyr Cove, Nevada, US
 Zephyr Glacier, in Antarctica
Zephyrhills, Florida

Science and technology

Computing

 Zephyr (operating system), small real-time operating system
 Zephyr (protocol), an instant messenger protocol and application-suite
Zephyr, a hardware revision of Microsoft's Xbox 360 video game console
 Zephyr, a commercial test management tool sold by SmartBear Software

Other uses in science and technology
 Zephyr (rover), a NASA concept for a robotic Venus rover
 Zephyranthes, a plant genus whose species include the zephyr lily
 Washoe Zephyr, a meteorological phenomenon in the western US

Transportation

Aviation
 Advanced Aviation Zephyr, ultralight, homebuilt aircraft
 Addyman Zephyr, a one-off, single seat sailplane
 Airbus Zephyr or Qinetiq Zephyr, a series of solar-powered UAVs
 ATEC Zephyr, Czech ultralight aircraft manufactured by ATEC
 Bartlett Zephyr, light, civil aircraft of the 1940s
 Fouga Zéphyr, a carrier-capable jet trainer for the French Navy, based on the Fouga Magister
 Qinetiq Zephyr, later Airbus Zephyr, a solar powered unmanned air vehicle
 RAE Zephyr, 1923 pusher biplane

Maritime
  – one of several mercantile vessels of that name
 Zephyr (dinghy), a New Zealand sailing dinghy class
 HMS Zephyr, eight ships of the British Royal Navy
 RV Zephyr, research vessel
 USS Zephyr (PC-8), United States Navy ship
 Zephyr Seaport Liberty Cruise, a sightseeing service operated by Circle Line Downtown in New York

Rail

 Zephyr (train), a type of train-set with matching streamlined locomotive and passenger cars

Road
 Ford Zephyr, a 1950–1972 British executive car
 Kawasaki Zephyr, a 1989–2000 Japanese sport bike
 Lincoln-Zephyr, a 1936–1942 American mid-size luxury car
 Lincoln-Zephyr V12 engine, a 1936–1948 series of engines
 Lincoln Zephyr, a 2022–present Chinese mid-size luxury sedan
 Lincoln MKZ, a 2006–2020 American mid-size luxury sedan, originally named the Lincoln Zephyr
 Mercury Zephyr, a 1978–1983 American compact car

Sport
 Zephyr (garment), a garment used in competitive rowing
 Chicago Zephyrs, former name of the NBA franchise currently known as the Washington Wizards
 Muskegon Zephyrs, former ice hockey team
 New Orleans Zephyrs, the former name of the Pacific Coast League franchise now known as the New Orleans Baby Cakes
 Zephyr skateboard team, also known as Z-Boys, in the 1970s

Other uses
 Zephyrus, one of the Anemoi and the Greek god of the west wind
 Zephyr (cloth), a lightweight cotton fabric
 Zephyr, a cultural festival of Orissa Engineering College
 Zephyr, a wooden roller coaster at the former amusement park Pontchartrain Beach, New Orleans, Louisiana

See also 

 
 
 Zephir (disambiguation)
 Zefir (disambiguation)
 Xephyr, a unix computer display server which targets a window on a host X Server as its framebuffer
 Sapphire (disambiguation)